Eivor Mona-Lisa Pursiainen (née Strandvall; 21 June 1951, Kronoby — 7 August 2000) was a Finnish female sprinter, who was especially successful in 1973–1974, being ranked #2 in the world over 100 metres and # 3, over 200 metres and 400 metres in 1973. In 1974, she was ranked #7 in the 100 metres and #6 in the 200 metres.  She won 100 metres and 200 metres at the 1973 Summer Universiade held in Moscow. She won a bronze medal in the 200 metres at the 1974 European Athletics Championships, as well as a silver medal in the 4 x 400 metres relay, and helped Finland to a National Record of 3:25.7. She would take two silver medals over the 100 metres and 200 metres at the 1975 Summer Universiade in Rome.

Pursiainen died in 2000 from breast cancer, aged 49, at Kauniainen.

References

External links
 
Tilastopaja profile for Mona-Lisa Pursiainen (in Finnish) 
Track & Field News Women's World Rankings, 1947-2002

1951 births
2000 deaths
People from Kronoby
Finnish female sprinters
Deaths from breast cancer
Olympic athletes of Finland
Athletes (track and field) at the 1972 Summer Olympics
Athletes (track and field) at the 1976 Summer Olympics
European Athletics Championships medalists
Universiade medalists in athletics (track and field)
Universiade gold medalists for Finland
Universiade silver medalists for Finland
Swedish-speaking Finns
Medalists at the 1973 Summer Universiade
Medalists at the 1975 Summer Universiade
Olympic female sprinters
Sportspeople from Ostrobothnia (region)